KCLA-LP is a low power AAA (Adult Album Alternative) radio station broadcasting out of San Pedro, California.

History
KCLA-LP began broadcasting on March 3, 2013.

In April 2017, the station went silent until June 30, 2021.

References

External links
 

San Pedro, Los Angeles
CLA-LP
2015 establishments in California
CLA-LP
Radio stations established in 2015